Eric Hampson (born 11 November 1921) is an English former footballer who played in the Football League for Stoke City.

Life and career
Hampson was born in Stoke-on-Trent. He joined Stoke City from local feeder club Summerbank during World War II. He joined the Army in 1944 and returned to Stoke in 1948 where he made just eight appearances in four seasons before leaving for non-league Stafford Rangers.

He retired from professional football in 1954. In 1959, it was reported that Hampson subsequently became a confectioner and tobacconist, and had moved to Bognor with his wife, Ethel.

Career statistics

References

1921 births
Possibly living people
English footballers
Stoke City F.C. players
Stafford Rangers F.C. players
English Football League players
Association football defenders
British Army personnel of World War II